Sylvain Remy (born 15 November 1980) is a former Beninese football player, who last played for Clermont.

International career
He was part of the Beninese 2004 African Nations Cup team, who finished bottom of their group in the first round of competition, thus failing to secure qualification for the quarter-finals.

References

External links

1980 births
Living people
Beninese footballers
Benin international footballers
Clermont Foot players
Beninese expatriates in France
2004 African Cup of Nations players
Association football defenders